Death Grips is the eponymous debut extended play by experimental hip hop group Death Grips. It was released on March 8, 2011, as a free download directly from the group's website in ZIP file format.

Background
After forming on December 21, 2010, in Sacramento, California, Death Grips released their first song "Full Moon (Death Classic)" on March 8, 2011, along with a corresponding music video and a free self-titled EP. The EP consists of six tracks; the latter three of which were later renamed and rereleased the following month on their debut mixtape, Exmilitary.

Following the release of Exmilitary on April 25, 2011, the EP was removed from the band's website, however, "Full Moon (Death Classic)" and "Face Melter (How To Do Impossible Things)" remained available for a short time. "Full Moon (Death Classic)" was released as the band's debut single on April 27, 2011, and was the only song from the EP still available on streaming services, and for digital download. However, in February 2023, the majority of Death Grips’ discography was made available for free download on the Third Worlds website, which included the EP.

Track listing
Original 2011 track list

The songs "Takyon (Death Yon)", "Known For It (Freak Grips)", and "Where's It At (Death Heated)" appeared on Death Grips' debut mixtape, Exmilitary.
On the mixtape, "Known For It (Freak Grips)" is shortened to "Known For It", and "Where's It At (Death Heated)" is renamed to "I Want It I Need It (Death Heated)".
Elements of "Full Moon (Death Classic)" and "System Blower" were used on the band's remix of "Sacrifice" by Björk, which she included on her 2012 remix album Bastards.

2023 Free download track listing

Personnel
 MC Ride – vocals
 Zach Hill – drums, production 
 Andy Morin – keyboards, programming, production

Other personnel
 Mexican Girl – backing vocals (track 1)

References

External links

2011 debut EPs
Death Grips albums
Self-released EPs